Papyrus 4 (part of Suppl. Gr. 1120) is an early New Testament papyrus of the Gospel of Luke in Greek. Opinions differ as to its age. It has been dated anywhere from the late second century to the fourth century.

Description 

It is one of the earliest manuscripts (along with ) of the Gospel of Luke and contains extensive sections of its first six chapters. It is currently housed in the Bibliothèque nationale de France (Suppl. Gr. 1120) in Paris.

It contains texts of Luke: 1:58-59; 1:62-2:1; 2:6-7; 3:8-4:2; 4:29-32, 34-35; 5:3-8; 5:30-6:16

The Greek text-type of this codex is a representative of the Alexandrian.

 Notable readings

In Luke 6:2 — οὐκ ἔξεστιν (not lawful) for οὐκ ἔξεστιν ποιεῖν (not lawful to do); the reading is supported only by Codex Vaticanus Graecus 1209, (Codex Bezae), Codex Nitriensis, 700, lat, copsa, copbo, arm, geo;

Some early accounts stated that  was used as stuffing for the binding of a codex of Philo, written in the late third century and found walled up in a house at Coptos. Apparently this account was incorrect, however, as the fragments were actually found stashed between pages of the codex of Philo, not in the binding.

Willker tentatively agrees stating 'The [3rd century] dating given is that of NA. Some date it into the 2nd CE (e.g. Roberts and Comfort). This is quite probable considering the use as binding material for a 3rd CE codex'. Comfort and Barret also show that  and  have affinities with a number of late 2nd century papyri. Roberts (1979), Skeat (1997), Willker and Stanton also date the text to the late 2nd century, leading Gregory to conclude that '[t]here is good reason to believe that  ... may have been written late in the 2nd century...'. Frederic Kenyon dated  to the fourth century. In 2018, Brent Nongbri argued that it was not possible with current knowledge to date  to a specific century, and that any dates from the 2nd to 4th centuries were equally reasonable.

See also 
 List of New Testament papyri
 Luke 1–6

Notes

References 
 Charlesworth, SD (2007) T. C. Skeat, P64+67 and P4, and the Problem of Fibre Orientation in Codicological Reconstruction, New Test. Stud. Vol.53, pp. 582–604, 
 Comfort, Philip W. "New Reconstructions and Identifications of New Testament Papyri," Novum Testamentum, Vol. 41, Fasc. 3., (Jul., 1999) pp. 214–230.
 
 Gregory, A. The Reception of Luke and Acts in the Period Before Irenaeus, Mohr Siebeck, (2003) , p. 28
 C. R. Gregory, Die griechischen Handschriften des Neuen Testament, Hinrichs, p. 45.
 Head, P. M. (2005), Is P4, P64 and P67 the Oldest Manuscript of the Four Gospels? A Response to T. C. Skeat, New Test. Stud. 51, pp. 450–457, 
 Roberts, Colin. Manuscript, Society, and Belief in Early Christian Egypt Longwood (June 1979)  pp. 8+23
 Skeat, T. C. (1997), The Oldest Manuscript of the Four Gospels?, New Test. Stud. 43, p. 1-34
 Stanton, G. N. (1997), The Fourfold Gospel, New Test. Stud. 43, p. 327

External links 

 Willker, Wieland. A Textual Commentary on the Greek Gospels, (undated+unfinished)
 

New Testament papyri
3rd-century biblical manuscripts
Bibliothèque nationale de France collections
Early Greek manuscripts of the New Testament
Gospel of Luke papyri
Gospel of Matthew papyri